La'Mar Lorraine Johnson (born July 12, 1978), professionally known by her stage name Sylk-E. Fyne, is an American female rapper from South Central Los Angeles and former member of the unreleased group G.B.M. from Eazy-E's Ruthless Records. She started rapping while in high school and, after getting a college degree, recorded her 1998 debut, Raw Sylk, on RCA. She later released her second album Tha Cum Up on Rufftown in 2000, toured with Bone Thugs-n-Harmony, and made numerous guest appearances on hip hop albums in the late 1990s. She had a hit solo song in 1998, "Romeo and Juliet", which reached number 6 on the Billboard Singles Chart. She briefly reappeared a couple of years later in 2000 with a song called "Ya Style" featuring Snoop Dogg and Bizzy Bone. In 2010 Sylk E. Fyne resurfaced back into the rap game. She released 2 new songs on her official Myspace page.

Discography

Studio albums
Raw Sylk (RCA Records, 1998) US Billboard Top 200 peak #121, US R&B peak #47
Tha Cum Up (Rufftown, 2000)

Singles

References

External links
Sylk-E. Fyne on Myspace

1977 births
Living people
American women rappers
Musicians from California
American hip hop musicians
21st-century American rappers
21st-century American women musicians
21st-century women rappers